Muhammad Ibrahim Khan may refer to:

 Muhammad Ibrahim Khan (politician) (1915–2003), founder and first President of Azad Kashmir
 Muhammad Ibrahim Khan (judge) (died 1963), Judicial Commissioner of the Peshawar High Court
 Muhammad Ibrahim Khan (Pakistani judge) (born 1962), Justice of the Peshawar High Court
Mohammad Ibrahim Khan Jhagra, Pakistani politician
Muhammad Ibrahim Khan Khattak, member of the Pakistani parliament